The  Indianapolis Colts season was the franchise's 63rd season in the National Football League and the 32nd in Indianapolis, surpassing the 31 seasons they played in their original home city of Baltimore. It was also the fourth season under the trio of head coach Chuck Pagano, general manager Ryan Grigson and quarterback Andrew Luck. The Colts entered the 2015 season as the defending AFC South champions after compiling an 11–5 record before falling to the New England Patriots in a controversial AFC Championship Game matchup.

After a week 8 loss to the Carolina Panthers, the Colts fired offensive coordinator Pep Hamilton and elevated associate head coach Rob Chudzinski to replace him. The Colts failed to improve from their three consecutive 11–5 records and finished the season at 8–8. They  lost the division to the Houston Texans and failed to make the playoffs for the first time since 2011 and only the fourth time since 1998. This was their first time to lose to the Houston Texans at home since the Texans entered the NFL in 2002.

2015 draft class

Source: 

Draft trades
 Indianapolis traded their second and fourth-round selections (No. 61 and 128, respectively) to the Tampa Bay Buccaneers in exchange for Tampa's third and fourth-round selections (No. 65 and 109, respectively).
 Indianapolis traded their fifth and seventh-round selections (No. 165 and 244, respectively) to the San Francisco 49ers in exchange for San Francisco's fifth-round selection (No. 151).
 Indianapolis acquired an additional sixth-round selection (No. 207 overall) in a trade that sent cornerback Marcus Burley to the Seattle Seahawks.
 Indianapolis traded their original seventh-round selection (No. 246 overall) to the San Francisco 49ers in exchange for linebacker Cam Johnson.
 Indianapolis acquired an additional seventh-round selection (No. 244 overall) in a trade that sent defensive end Caesar Rayford to the Dallas Cowboys.

Undrafted free agents
Source:

Roster moves

Free agents

Additions

Departures

Staff

Final roster

Schedule

Preseason

Regular season

Note: Intra-division opponents are in bold text.

Game summaries

Week 1: at Buffalo Bills
With the loss, the Colts fell to 0–1.

Week 2: vs. New York Jets
With the upset loss, the Colts fell to 0–2 for the second straight year.

Week 3: at Tennessee Titans
After leading 14–0 in the first half, the Titans would score 27 unanswered points to take a 27–14 lead. However, the Colts would own the fourth quarter, as they outscored Tennessee 21–6. The Titans had a chance to tie the game after pulling within 35–33, but the 2-point attempt failed, and the Colts held on for the win. With the win, the Colts improved to 1–2 and picked up their 8th straight win over the Titans.

Week 4: vs. Jacksonville Jaguars

Due to an injured shoulder, Andrew Luck missed the first game of his career, and was replaced by 40-year-old veteran Matt Hasselbeck, who avoided any turnovers and led the Colts to a 16–13 win in overtime. Jacksonville kicker Jason Myers would miss 3 game-winning field goal attempts at the end of the fourth quarter and one in overtime. Adam Vinatieri would nail the game winner in overtime to give Indianapolis the win. With the win, the Colts evened their record at 2–2.

Week 5: at Houston Texans
Despite a Hail Mary being thrown at the end of the first half, the Colts still managed to hold on for the win. With their 3rd straight win, the Colts improved to 3–2, and set a new NFL record for most consecutive wins against division opponents with 16.

Week 6: vs. New England Patriots

This game was notorious for a terrible playcall by the Colts, now known as the Colts Catastrophe.  With the Colts trailing 27–21 late in the 3rd quarter, Pagano opted to run a scrimmage play using special teams on 4th and 3 on the Colts' 37-yard line.  However, a bizarre formation resulted in a Patriots tackle for loss, Colts turnover, and a flag for illegal formation.  The Patriots easily scored a touchdown on the next drive and went on to win the game by 7 points, 34–27. The playcall was universally criticized and was considered by many to be the worst play in NFL history.

Week 7: vs. New Orleans Saints

In the Super Bowl rematch between the two teams, the Saints started the first half, dominating the Colts 20–0, which stunned Indy's home crowd. The Colts looked for answers in the second half, but Andrew Luck struggled to find open receivers and he was intercepted twice on defense.

Week 8: at Carolina Panthers

The Colts traveled to Charlotte to take on Cam Newton and his undefeated Carolina Panthers, looking to hang their first loss on them. After struggling much in the first half, the Colts answered back in the fourth quarter. However, it wasn't enough to stop the Panthers in overtime and the Colts would lose 29–26.

Week 9: vs. Denver Broncos

Peyton Manning returned to Indianapolis for the final time.

Late in the fourth quarter, with the Colts leading 27–24, they looked to extend the lead on a field goal by Adam Vinatieri, but it was overturned and the Colts still won 27–24.

With the win, the Colts went to 4–5, while the Broncos suffered their first loss and dropped to 7–1.

However, two days later, Andrew Luck was hospitalized with a lacerated kidney along with an abdominal injury. He ended up missing the rest of the season, putting more pressure on veteran backup Matt Hasselbeck, who was 2–0 in 2 starts due to Luck's previous injury.

Week 11: at Atlanta Falcons
The Colts would trail 21–7 late in the third quarter, but they would fight back to tie the game at 21 after D'Qwell Jackson returned an interception at the Atlanta 6-yard line for a touchdown. The Colts would then later on march down the field to win it with an Adam Vinatieri field goal with 52 seconds left. With the win, the Colts improved to 5–5. They also improved to 14–2 all time against the Falcons.

Week 12: vs. Tampa Bay Buccaneers
With the win, the Colts improved to 6–5 and remained in the playoff hunt.

Week 13: at Pittsburgh Steelers
The Colts would suffer an embarrassing loss on national television to the Pittsburgh Steelers. The Steelers would lead for the majority of the game, and the Colts could not get into any rhythm. With the loss, the Colts fell to 6–6.

Week 14: at Jacksonville Jaguars
The Colts would lead 13–3, but Jacksonville would outscore Indianapolis 48–3 from then on. With the loss, the Colts fell to 6–7 and lost to a divisional opponent for the first time since 2012, snapping their NFL record 16-game winning streak in division play.

Week 15: vs. Houston Texans

This, notably, is the Colts' first loss to the Texans at Lucas Oil Stadium since the latter team began play in 2002.

Week 16: at Miami Dolphins
With the win, the Colts improved to 7–8. This was Matt Hasselbeck's final career game.

Week 17: vs. Tennessee Titans
With the win, the Colts ended their season at 8–8 and won their 9th straight game against the Titans.

Standings

Division

Conference

References

External links
 

Indianapolis
Indianapolis Colts seasons
Indianapolis Colts